Walsingham Academy is an independent Catholic school in Williamsburg, Virginia. It was founded in 1947 and is administered by the Sisters of Mercy of Merion, Pennsylvania.

History

Saint Bede parish in Williamsburg purchased a building originally constructed as a fraternity house for students of the College of William & Mary, 601 College Terrace, adjacent to the original location of Saint Bede for use as housing by the USO, in which thousands of soldiers and families stayed during this period of use. On 16 September 1947, the Sisters of Mercy opened Walsingham Academy, a private Catholic school, in this building. After the school's move, the building served as a rectory and is now a privately owned home.

Athletics

The sports teams have won state championship titles in track and field, lacrosse, golf, soccer, basketball, volleyball, swimming, cross country, and sailing. Walsingham Academy won the baseball DIII State Championship in 2018 over Fuqua in 10 innings with a 6 to 5 score, capturing their first ever baseball state championship. The girls' track and field team has won the VISAA Division 2 State Championship 5 years in a row.

The choir
The Walsingham Academy choir performed in Beijing in 2008 and in Rome in 2010. They also performed at the 2012 Summer Olympics in London.

References

External links
 Official site

1947 establishments in Virginia
Catholic secondary schools in Virginia
Educational institutions established in 1947
Private K-12 schools in Virginia
Roman Catholic Diocese of Richmond
Schools in Williamsburg, Virginia
Sisters of Mercy schools